= The Campus Chronicle =

Former newspaper of the University of Massachusetts Amherst

- Type: Weekly tabloid
- Format: Broadsheet
- Editor: Daniel J. Fitzgibbons
- Founded: 4 September 1985
- Ceased publication: 27 June 2003
- Language: English
- Headquarters: 203 Munson Hall, University of Massachusetts Amherst
- Circulation: 9,800
- Price: Free
- Website: www.umass.edu/chronicle/

The Campus Chronicle was a tabloid at the University of Massachusetts Amherst for faculty and staff. Its first edition appeared in September 1985. The Campus Chronicle was published weekly during the academic year. The Chronicle operated with funding from the state, and ceased publication in 2003 during statewide budget cuts.
